Charlie W. Humber (February 14, 1914 – June 27, 1991) was an American baseball second baseman in the Negro leagues. He played with the Baltimore Elite Giants in 1943 and the Newark Eagles in 1945.

Some sources combine his career with Thomas Humber,  who played Minor League Baseball from 1955 to 1961, but this was a different player.

References

External links
  and Seamheads

Baltimore Elite Giants players
Newark Eagles players
1914 births
1991 deaths
Baseball players from Georgia (U.S. state)
Baseball second basemen
People from Richland, Georgia
20th-century African-American sportspeople